Bo Wen Constituency was a constituency in Singapore. It existed from 1984 to 1988. S Vasoo was an MP until it shifted to Radin Mas in 1988. It absorbed part of Ang Mo Kio, Kebun Baru & Yio Chu Kang constituencies.

Member of Parliament

Elections

References

Singaporean electoral divisions
Toa Payoh
Constituencies established in 1984
Constituencies disestablished in 1988
1984 establishments in Singapore
1988 disestablishments in Singapore